Richard Smallwood (born November 30, 1948 in Atlanta, Georgia) is an American gospel artist who formed The Richard Smallwood Singers in 1977 in Washington, DC.

Education and career
Richard Smallwood graduated cum laude from Howard University with a dual B.A. degree in classical vocal performance and piano, in addition to graduate work in the field of ethnomusicology. Smallwood was a member of The Celestials, the first gospel group on Howard University's campus. That group was the first gospel act to appear at Switzerland's Montreux Jazz Festival. Smallwood was also a founding member of Howard's first gospel choir.

Smallwood's recording career began in 1982 with the album The Richard Smallwood Singers. The album spent 87 weeks on Billboard's Gospel chart. Its followup, Psalms was nominated for a Grammy. Two years later the album Textures was also nominated. Textures spawned the now-classic "Center Of My Joy" written by Richard Smallwood along with Bill and Gloria Gaither. Smallwood won his first Grammy, along with a Dove Award for his production on the Quincy Jones' gospel project Handel's Messiah: A Soulful Celebration.

Smallwood's music has been recorded by artists such as Destiny's Child, Yolanda Adams, Karen Clark-Sheard, and many more. He accompanied opera legend Leontyne Price at a White House Christmas celebration during the Reagan administration. Smallwood, with his current group Vision, has recorded several successful projects for Verity records. He finished his master's degree in Divinity from Howard University in 2004 and was inducted into the Gospel Music Hall of Fame in 2006.

Smallwood's next project was recorded live at the Hammerstein Ballroom at the Manhattan Center in New York. The concert features guests Kim Burrell on "Journey", Kelly Price on "Morning's Breaking," Chaka Khan on "Precious Is Your Name," as well as The Hawkins Family, Tramaine Hawkins, and the original roster of singers who comprised The Richard Smallwood Singers and Vision. Aretha Franklin and The Clark Sisters would contribute to additional studio tracks to appear on the album.

Among Smallwood's most popular songs are "Total Praise", composed in 1996 while he was experiencing sorrow in his life, and "I Love the Lord", popularized by singer Whitney Houston in the film, The Preacher's Wife.

Discography

Albums
with Union Temple Baptist Church Young Adult Choir
 Look Up And Live (1974)
 Give Us Peace (1976)
with Richard Smallwood Singers
 Richard Smallwood Singers (Onyx/Benson Records, 1982)
 Psalms (Onyx/Benson Records, 1984)
 Textures (Word, 1987)
 Vision (Word, 1988)
 Portrait (Word, 1990)
 Testimony (Sparrow, 1992)
 Live at Howard University (Sparrow, 1993)
with Vision
 Adoration: Live in Atlanta (Verity, 1996)
 Rejoice (Christmas Project) (Verity, 1997)
 Healing: Live in Detroit (Verity, 1999)
 Persuaded: Live in D.C. (Verity, 2001)
 Journey: Live in New York (Verity, 2006)
 Promises (Verity, 2011)
 Anthology Live (Verity, 2015)

Compilations
 Gospel Greats (Benson, 1994)
 Memorable Moments (Sparrow, 1999)
 Praise & Worship Songs of Richard Smallwood With Vision (Verity, 2003)
 Quintessential Collection (EMI Gospel, 2007)
 "Center of My Joy" (Rhino/Shanachie, 2007)

Awards & Recognitions
 Received the Stellar Awards' James Cleveland Lifetime Achievement Award in 2005.
 Received an Honorary Doctorate of Sacred Music from the Richmond Virginia Seminary in May of 2006.
 Inducted into the Gospel Music Hall of Fame at the Richland Country Club in Nashville, TN on November 14, 2006.
 Received the Howard University Distinguished Achievement Award.

Grammy, Stellar & NAACP Image Award Nominations
 1984: Grammy Nomination, Best Soul Gospel Performance, Duo or Group - Richard Smallwood Singers: "Psalms"
 1988: Grammy Nomination, Best Soul Gospel Performance, Male - Richard Smallwood: "You Did It All"
 1990: Grammy Nomination, Best Soul Gospel Performance, Album-Richard Smallwood Singers: "Portrait'
 1991: Grammy Nomination, Best Contemporary Soul Gospel Performance, Album-Richard Smallwood Singers: "Testimony"
 1993: Grammy Nomination, Best Contemporary Soul Gospel Performance,  Album-Richard Smallwood Singers: "Live"
 2001: Grammy Nomination, Best Traditional Soul Gospel Performance, Album-Richard Smallwood with Vision: "Persuaded: Live in DC"
 2011: Grammy Nomination, Best Gospel Song, "Trust Me"
 2001: NAACP Image Award Nomination for Best Gospel Artist, Traditional - Persuaded: Live in DC 2003: Stellar Award Nomination for Artist Of The Year - Persuaded: Live in DC; Verity 2003: Stellar Award Nomination for Song Of The Year - "My Everything (Praise Waiteth)"; Verity
 2003: Stellar Award Nomination for Choir Of The Year - Persuaded: Live in DC 2003: Stellar Award Nomination for Producer Of The Year - Persuaded: Live in DC 2003: Stellar Award Nomination for Male Vocalist Of The Year - Persuaded: Live in DC 2003: Stellar Award Nomination for CD Of The Year - Persuaded: Live in DC 2003: Stellar Award Nomination for Traditional Male Vocalist of the Year - Persuaded: Live in DC 2003: Stellar Award Nomination for Music Video of the Year - Persuaded: Live in DC 2016: Stellar Award Nomination for Traditional Male Vocalist of the Year - Anthology Live 2016: Stellar Award Nomination for Traditional Choir of the Year - Anthology Live 2016: Stellar Award Nomination for Choir of the Year - Anthology Live 2016: Stellar Award Nomination for Special Event CD of the Year - Anthology Live 2016: Stellar Award Nomination for Praise and Worship CD of the Year - Anthology LiveStellar Award Wins
 1992: Stellar Award for Best Group/Duo - Contemporary – Testimony 2000: Stellar Award for Choir of the Year - Healing – Live in Detroit 
 2000: Stellar Award for Traditional Male Vocalist of the Year - Healing – Live in Detroit 
 2000: Stellar Award for Traditional Choir of the Year - Healing – Live in Detroit 
 2002: Stellar Award for Traditional CD of the Year - Persuaded – Live in DC  2002: Stellar Award for Traditional Choir of the Year - Persuaded – Live in DCReferences

External links
 Richard Smallwood on Myspace - (Official Richard Smallwood Site)
 
 Richard Smallwood Awards
 [ Richard Smallwood Chart History] on Billboard''
 Photos of Smallwood's Journey Concert from Landru Design

Living people
American gospel singers
African-American Christians
Howard University alumni
1948 births
Musicians from Atlanta
20th-century African-American male singers
21st-century African-American male singers